Daniel Travanti Muir (born September 12, 1983) is a former American football defensive tackle in the National Football League (NFL). He was signed by the Green Bay Packers as an undrafted free agent in 2007. He played college football at Kent State. 
Muir has also been a member of the Indianapolis Colts, St. Louis Rams, and New York Jets.

Early years
Muir attended Fairmont Heights High School and later transferred to Parkdale High School in Riverdale, Maryland where he was a four-year letterman. He played both defensive tackle and offensive guard. He earned All-State honors after finishing his senior season with 96 tackles, including 13.5 sacks. He recorded 179 tackles, including 28.5 sacks, his final two seasons. He also lettered in wrestling, where he finished second in state as a junior and third as a senior.

College career
Muir attended Kent State where he started 45 of his 46 career games there. He also left Kent State ranked third in school history in career sacks (14.5) and seventh in tackles-for-losses (35). He finished his career with 198 tackles, he also had three forced fumbles, two fumble recoveries, and one interception. He began his college career at defensive tackle before moving to defensive end, where he earned First-team All-MAC honors as a senior.

Muir did not play in 2002 due to the NCAA's initial eligibility guidelines. In 2003 as a freshman, he started the first 11 games before turning over his starting position to a senior in the season finale. He finished the season with 46 tackles, 7.5 for losses, 1.5 sacks and one blocked field goal. In 2004 as a sophomore, he started 11 games recording 48 tackles, eight for losses, and 4.5 sacks. In 2005 as a junior, he started 11 games and earned Second-team All-MAC honors, he recorded 52 tackles, 8.5 for losses, and three sacks. In 2006 as a senior, he started 12 games and recorded 52 tackles, 11 for losses, and 5.5 sacks. He returned his only career interception for five yards.

Professional career

Green Bay Packers
After going undrafted in the 2007 NFL Draft, Muir signed with the Green Bay Packers on May 4, 2007. In 2007, he played in three games, after becoming the only undrafted rookie to make the roster out of training camp. He recorded eight tackles, four solo for the season. He played for the Packers in Dallas, Chicago, and against Detroit. Before the start of the 2008 season, he was waived by the Packers.

Indianapolis Colts
After being waived by the Packers before the start of the 2008 season, he was claimed by the Indianapolis Colts. He was re-signed to a one-year $1.7 million contract on April 13, 2010.

St. Louis Rams
Muir joined the St. Louis Rams on July 31, 2011, by signing a one-year $1.85 million contract. He was cut September 2011.

Second stint with Colts
On October 10, 2011, Muir re-signed with the Indianapolis Colts. He was waived on November 8, 2011.

Second stint with Packers
Muir signed with the Green Bay Packers on March 23, 2012. He was released on August 31.

New York Jets
Muir was signed by the New York Jets on October 10, 2012. He was waived on October 30, 2012.

Houston Texans
On July 25, 2013, Muir signed with the Houston Texans. He was released by the Texans due to an Injury Settlement.

Oakland Raiders
On October 9, 2013 Muir signed with the Oakland Raiders.

Personal life
Muir is one of many siblings and was raised by his Jamaican native parents in Lanham, Maryland. He married his college sweetheart Kristin Wright on April 25, 2009.

Muir currently resides in Indianapolis with his family.

Muir hosted a Christmas dinner for homeless teens with the help of Outreach Inc.

References

External links
 Indianapolis Colts bio
 ESPN.com bio
 Yahoo! Sports bio
 CBSSports.com bio

1983 births
Living people
People from Washington, D.C.
American football defensive tackles
Kent State Golden Flashes football players
Green Bay Packers players
Indianapolis Colts players
St. Louis Rams players
New York Jets players
Kansas City Chiefs players
Houston Texans players
Oakland Raiders players